The 1953 UCLA Bruins football team represented the University of California, Los Angeles (UCLA) in the 1953 college football season.  They played their home games at the Los Angeles Memorial Coliseum and were coached by Red Sanders. It was Sanders' fifth season as the UCLA head coach. The team completed the season with an 8–2 record and was the Pacific Coast Conference champion. They played in the 1954 Rose Bowl and were defeated by eighth-ranked Michigan State, 28–20. The Bruins finished ranked fourth in the Coaches Poll and fifth in the AP Poll.

Previous season
The Bruins finished the 1952 season in second place in the Pacific Coast Conference with a record of 8–1. They were ranked in sixth place in both AP and UPI final polls.

Schedule

Game summaries

USC

By winning this game, the Bruins were the PCC Champions and received the Rose Bowl bid. California assisted with a 21–21 tie with Stanford. Bob Heydenfeldt and Paul Cameron scored in the second and fourth quarter respectively.

Michigan State (Rose Bowl) 

This was the first meeting between the two schools. It was the first Rose Bowl appearance for the Spartans. They had previously only played in the 1938 Orange Bowl. It was the third bowl appearance for the Bruins.  The weather was sunny. The Spartans wore their green home jerseys and the Bruins wore their white road jerseys.

The Spartans fumbled twice in the first half, which allowed the Bruins the first two scores. Michigan State had only one completed pass and 56 yards in the first half. The Spartans scored a touchdown with 4:45 remaining in the first half.

Victor Postula knocked down four Bruin passes. Coach Biggie Munn instituted a "split line offense" against the Bruins.

The Spartans assembled two long drives in the third quarter to pull ahead 21–-14. The Bruins recovered another Spartan fumble and scored to make the score 21–20. But the extra point kick failed. Billy Wells of Michigan State returned a punt 62 yards for a touchdown with 4:51 left in the game.

First quarter scoring
UCLA — Bill Stits 13-yard pass from Paul Cameron. John Hermann converts.

Second quarter scoring
UCLA — Cameron, two-yard run. Hermann converts. 
MSU — Ellis Duckett, six-yard blocked punt return. Evan Slonac converts.

Third quarter scoring
MSU — LeRoy Bolden, one-yard run. Slonac converts. 
MSU — Billy Wells, two-yard run. Slonac converts.

Fourth quarter scoring
UCLA — Rommie Loudd, 28-yard pass from Cameron passes 28 yards to Rommie Loudd. Kick failed. 
MSU — Wells, 62-yard punt return. Slonac converts

Awards and honors
First Team All Americans – Paul Cameron (H, Consensus selection)
All Coast/Conference first team – Chuck Doud (T), Jack Ellena (T), Paul Cameron (H)

References

UCLA
UCLA Bruins football seasons
Pac-12 Conference football champion seasons
UCLA Bruins football
UCLA Bruins football